Charles Armand de Gontaut, duc de Biron (5 August 1663 — 23 July 1756), great-grandson of Armand de Gontout-Biron, was a French military leader who served with distinction under Louis XIV and Louis XV, and was made a Marshal of France by the latter.

He commanded the French vanguard at the Battle of Oudenaarde (1708), and noticed the first manoeuvre of deviation by Marlborough. Nevertheless, opposed on his lines by numerical superior forces, he was unable to change the course of events that were to happen.

He married Marie-Antoinette, duchesse de Lauzun and niece of Antoine Nompar de Caumont, duc de Lauzun.

They had 14 children among whom were

Louis Antoine de Gontaut (1700–1788), Marshal of France.
Charles-Antoine (1708–1800), Duc de Biron and father of the memoirist Armand Louis de Gontaut, duc de Biron 1747–1783.
Judith-Charlotte, married 07/05/1717 Claude Alexandre de Bonneval.
Geneviève, married 11/03/1720 Louis duc de Gramont, son of Antoine V de Gramont.

He died a few days before his 93rd birthday. When he died, his wife, ten of his 14 children, twelve of 32 grandchildren and eight of his 47 great-grandchildren had died before him. All his grandchildren and 24 great-grandchildren were born in his lifetime.

References

External links 
Dynasty of Gontaut

1663 births
1756 deaths
Biron, Charles-Armand de Gontaut
Charles-Armand de Gontaut
Charles-Armand
Peers created by Louis XV